Major General Sir John Jeremy Moore,  (5 July 1928 – 15 September 2007) was a British senior Royal Marine officer who served as the commander of the British land forces during the Falklands War in 1982. Moore received the surrender of the Argentine forces on the islands.

Military career
Moore came from a military family. His father, Lieutenant Colonel Charles Moore, and paternal grandfather, who joined the York and Lancaster Regiment as a private, were both awarded the Military Cross in 1916 during the First World War. His maternal grandfather was wounded at Tel el-Kebir in 1880, and later commanded the 4th Hussars.

Education
Moore was educated at Brambletye School in East Grinstead in Sussex and at Cheltenham College. He intended to join the Fleet Air Arm after leaving school, but was discouraged by relatively poor exam results. He joined the Royal Marines in 1947, intending to transfer, and enjoyed Royal Marine service so much that he spent the next 36 years in the Corps. After basic training, and service at sea in the cruiser , he joined X Troop of 40 Commando in Malaya in November 1950, during the Malayan Emergency. He first received a major military accolade in 1952 when he was awarded the Military Cross for gallantry after he and his men fought a pitched battle with communist insurgents in the Malayan jungle.

After attending the Australian Army Staff College from 1963 to 1964, Moore served with the 17th Gurkha Division in Borneo in 1965, countering Indonesian insurgents, and was Assistant Secretary to the Chiefs of Staff Committee at the Ministry of Defence from 1966 to 1968.

Career
Moore served as Housemaster of the Royal Marines School of Music in Deal, Kent in 1954, as an instructor at the NCO's School, as adjutant with 45 Commando from 1957 to 1959, spending much time in operations against EOKA in Cyprus, and then as an instructor at the Royal Military Academy, Sandhurst until 1962. He was posted to Brunei to join 42 Commando, as a company commander and later adjutant. While a company commander, he was awarded a Bar to the Military Cross in December 1962 when he led an attack against rebels holding the town of Limbang in the Sarawak area of Borneo, rescuing British and Australian hostages. He and his men were ferried across a river by Royal Navy Lieutenant Jeremy Black, who went on to command  in the Falklands War.

Moore led 42 Commando on a tour of duty in the then Provisional Irish Republican Army (IRA) stronghold of New Lodge. On promotion to lieutenant colonel in 1971, Moore was appointed in command of 42 Commando, completing two tours of duty in Northern Ireland, including participation in the high-profile Operation Motorman to eliminate areas proclaimed by the IRA as "no-go" to the Army and police. He was appointed an Officer of the Order of the British Empire in 1973.

Moore commanded the Royal Marines School of Music from 1973 to 1975, and then studied at the Royal College of Defence Studies in 1976. He commanded 3 Commando Brigade from 1977 until he was promoted to major general in 1979 and took command of all Royal Marine commando forces. He was appointed a Companion of the Order of the Bath in 1982, and was on the verge of retirement when the Commandant General Royal Marines, Lieutenant General Sir Steuart Pringle, was badly injured by a bomb planted by the IRA. Moore remained as Major General Commando Forces to cover for Pringle while he recovered.

Moore was handing over to the recuperated Pringle when Argentina invaded the Falkland Islands on 2 April 1982. He joined the task force planning team at Northwood before flying south to take command of land forces in theatre. His planning post was taken by Lieutenant General Richard Trant. Moore implemented the plans proposed by Thompson, with the British soldiers forced to march across the inhospitable islands in the absence of sufficient helicopters and against Argentine resistance. He accepted the surrender of the Argentinian commander, General de Brigada Mario Menéndez, in Port Stanley on 15 June 1982.

Moore was advanced to Knight Commander of the Order of the Bath on 11 October 1982 "in recognition of service within the operations in the South Atlantic", and left the Marines in 1983. He became Director General of the Food Manufacturers Federation, but left 18 months later. Later in life, he raised money for research into liver diseases after having a liver transplant. He was Colonel Commandant of the Royal Marines from 1990 to 1993, and joined the parade to commemorate the 25th anniversary of the Falklands War at Horse Guards Parade and the Mall on 17 June 2007.

Family
Moore married his wife, Veryan, in 1966. They had two daughters and a son. In later years, he suffered from arthritis and prostate cancer. Moore died on 15 September 2007, aged 79, and was survived by his wife and three children.

References

External links
 Biography
 Imperial War Museum Interview
 Obituary, The Times, 17 September 2007
 Obituary, The Guardian, 18 September 2007
Obituary, The Independent, 26 September 2007

1928 births
2007 deaths
British military personnel of The Troubles (Northern Ireland)
British military personnel of the Cyprus Emergency
British military personnel of the Malayan Emergency
British military personnel of the Indonesia–Malaysia confrontation
Royal Navy personnel of the Falklands War
Officers of the Order of the British Empire
Knights Commander of the Order of the Bath
People educated at Cheltenham College
Royal Marines generals
Recipients of the Military Cross
Academics of the Royal Military Academy Sandhurst
People educated at Brambletye School
Graduates of the Royal College of Defence Studies
Liver transplant recipients